Antiphrastis galenopa is a species of moth of the family Tortricidae. The status of this species is unclear.

References

Moths described in 1930
Archipini
Taxa named by Edward Meyrick
Taxa named by Joseph de Joannis